The Entity, also known as La Entidad, is a 2015 Peruvian supernatural horror film that was directed by Eduardo Schuldt. The film was released in 3D in Peru on 22 January 2015 and had its film festival debut on 28 August 2015 at Film4 FrightFest. The Entity has been billed as Peru's first 3D horror film and to have been loosely based on true stories.

Synopsis
Needing a good final project for college, a group of media students have chosen to film a documentary researching reaction videos. They're surprised when they find a video featuring someone they know, especially when they discover that anyone who has watched the original video (not the reaction video) has died after they finish watching. Intrigued, the students focus their research, which requires that they visit the deep web, and they find that the original video is tied to an ancient and deadly curse.

Cast
Rodrigo Falla as Joshua
Daniella Mendoza as Carla
Carlos Casella as Lucas
Mario Gaviria as Benjamín
Analú Polanco as Isabel

Reception
Prior to its release The Entity received comparisons to similarly themed films such as Paranormal Activity, The Blair Witch Project, and Ring. Review websites Flickering Myth and Nerdly commented upon these comparisons, as both felt that The Entity suffered from being too overly familiar to pre-existing works. Twitch Film was more positive, writing "Seasoned horror fans will find nothing new here, being able to guess most of the plot beats; but then again, Peruvian directors are just starting to try their hand at a genre which has been around for a long while. As more of them attempt to scare audiences, they'll hopefully improve on what came before. With its effective creepy atmosphere and solid use of an often-maligned gimmick, La Entidad is a good step in the right direction."

References

External links
 
 
 

2015 films
2015 3D films
2015 horror films
Peruvian supernatural horror films
Found footage films
2010s Peruvian films
Demons in film
Films about curses